CJ-033466 is a drug which acts as a potent and selective 5-HT4 serotonin receptor partial agonist. In animal tests it stimulated gastrointestinal motility with 30 times the potency of cisapride, and with lower affinity for the hERG channel.

See also 
 Imidazopyridine

References

Amines
Carboxamides
Chloroarenes
Imidazoles
Piperidines
Pyridines
Serotonin receptor agonists